Jaatinen is a Finnish surname.

Geographical distribution
As of 2014, 90.2% of all known bearers of the surname Jaatinen were residents of Finland, 2.8% of Australia, 2.0% of Sweden, 1.4% of Estonia and 1.2% of Canada.

In Finland, the frequency of the surname was higher than national average (1:2,099) in the following regions:
 1. North Karelia (1:839)
 2. Southern Savonia (1:947)
 3. Central Finland (1:1,102)
 4. South Karelia (1:1,249)
 5. Päijänne Tavastia (1:1,681)
 6. Tavastia Proper (1:1,759)
 7. Uusimaa (1:1,867)
 8. Southern Ostrobothnia (1:1,920)
 9. Kymenlaakso (1:2,035)

People
Antti Jaatinen, ice hockey player
Arno Jaatinen (1895-1946), military figure
Jussi Jaatinen (1899-1968), playwright
Margit Jaatinen, Miss Finland competitor in 1958
Marjatta Jaatinen (1927–2003), architect
Martti Jaatinen (1928–2008), architect
Matti Jaatinen (1928–2005), Finnish politician
Olli Jaatinen, bass player
Pekka Jaatinen, writer
Stig Jaatinen (1918-1999), professor of geography
Timo Jaatinen, politician from Helsinki
Toivo Jaatinen, sculptor, Saltus Award winner in 2002

References

Finnish-language surnames